Harry Stewart New (December 31, 1858 – May 9, 1937) was a U.S. politician, journalist, and Spanish–American War veteran.  He served as Chairman of the Republican National Committee, a United States senator from Indiana, and United States Postmaster General.

Biography
Harry Stewart New was born in Indianapolis, Indiana on December 31, 1858, the son of John C. New and Melissa (Beeler) New. His father served as Treasurer of the United States and his uncle, Jeptha D. New, was a U.S. Representative. He attended Butler University before going to work for the Indianapolis Journal where he was a reporter, editor, part owner, and publisher from 1878 to 1903. He is a member of the Sigma Chi Fraternity. He served in the Indiana State Senate from 1896 to 1900 and served in the Spanish–American War as captain and assistant adjutant general of the 7th Army Corps. He was a member of the Republican National Committee from 1900 to 1912, serving as chairman from 1907 to 1908, and later engaged in the stone quarrying and construction business.

New returned to politics with his election to the United States Senate in 1916, defeating incumbent John W. Kern. In the Senate, he served as chairman of the Committee on Territories and the Committee on Territories and Insular Possessions. He was also a "wet" or an anti-prohibitionist, and in August 1919 introduced early legislation proposing an independent United States Air Force.

In late March 1922, New became the first senator to use radio in his campaign—at that time, broadcasting a political speech was not widely done by candidates. His speech was transmitted by a U.S. Navy station, NOF in Washington, D.C., which immediately caused a complaint by Democrats about a government station being used for partisan purposes. This in turn quickly led to a ban on further use of the station for political activities.

New was defeated by Albert J. Beveridge for renomination in 1922 who lost the general election to Samuel M. Ralston. He was then appointed Postmaster General in the cabinet of President Warren G. Harding in 1923 and was reappointed by Calvin Coolidge in 1925.

After the end of the Coolidge Administration, New retired from active business pursuits and resided in Washington, D.C. In 1933, he was appointed a United States Commissioner to the Century of Progress Exposition in Chicago, Illinois. He died in Baltimore, Maryland, on May 9, 1937, and was interred in Crown Hill Cemetery in Indianapolis.

References

External links
 

 

|-

|-

|-

|-

1858 births
1937 deaths
Politicians from Indianapolis
American people of English descent
American Disciples of Christ
United States Postmasters General
Harding administration cabinet members
Coolidge administration cabinet members
Republican Party United States senators from Indiana
Republican National Committee chairs
Republican Party Indiana state senators
American male journalists
Butler University alumni
United States Army officers
American military personnel of the Spanish–American War
Burials at Crown Hill Cemetery